Esko, formerly called EskoArtwork, is a graphic arts company producing prepress software and hardware  for the packaging and labels, sign and display and publishing industries.

History
Esko was the result of a merger between Barco Graphics and Purup-Eskofot A/S in 2001. The merged company was called Esko-Graphics but was renamed Esko in 2006. In the fall of 2005, Esko became fully owned by Axcel, a Danish private equity investment company.

In August 2007 Esko announced that it was 'joining forces'  with Artwork Systems Group NV (AWS), its chief competitor in the packaging prepress market. Esko initially bought 76.69% of AWS shares for €196 million. Enfocus, a brand of PDF pre-flighting and workflow software originally acquired by Artwork Systems in 2000, became a subsidiary of the combined EskoArtwork company.

Reflecting the merger, Esko changed its name to EskoArtwork. It also introduced a new logo, though it is visually very close to the Esko original.

In January 2011, 100% of EskoArtwork shares have been transferred to Danaher. In January 2012, the name changed back to Esko, the logo was also updated. Esko acquired CAPE Systems (a palletization software vendor) in 2013, MediaBeacon (a Digital Asset Management vendor) in 2015 and Blue Software, LLC (a label and artwork management software vendor) in 2018.

Esko is headquartered in Ghent, Belgium.

References

External links
 

Software companies of Belgium
Computer hardware companies
Printing companies of Belgium
Danaher subsidiaries
Companies based in East Flanders